José Navarro Hernández (born 20 February 2003) is a Mexican professional footballer who plays as a forward for Liga MX club UNAM.

Career statistics

Club

References

External links
 
 
 

Living people
2003 births
Mexican footballers
Association football forwards
Club Universidad Nacional footballers
Liga MX players
Footballers from Mexico City